Lucion Anton Pushparaj, (born September 10, 1982) also spelled as Lucian Pushparaj, nicknamed Black Lion of Asia, is a Sri Lankan male IFBB professional bodybuilder. He has taken part in several notable international competitions. On 16 December 2018, he became the first Sri Lankan to win the WBPF World Championship title, and was crowned WBPF Mr. Universe.

He is also the first Sri Lankan Bodybuilder to participate in the IFBB Pro Arnold Classic Amateur, where he came 4th place.

Early life
Pushparaj was born on September 10, 1982, in Ja-Ela. He had his primary education at St. Xavier Maha Vidyalaya, and his secondary education at Basilica College, Ragama. In school Pushparaj was an active athlete, taking part in athletics, volleyball and cricket, even going on to win athletic events at all-island level.

Subsequently, he became a fitness instructor at various Gyms, and eventually tried his hand at Pro Bodybuilding. Despite the difficulties and discriminations faced, he managed to fund himself and train and compete.

Physical statistics 
Height: - 5'10"
Contest weight: - 100 kg
Off-season weight: - 110 kg
Chest: - 51" (contest shape)
Arms: - 19.5" (contest shape)

Career

2012-2013
Lucion Pushparaj was awarded the IFBB Pro status in 2012 and started to take part in domestic and international level competitions. He won his first major international competition in 2013, which was an IFBB Pro Championship in Oman.

2014
Pushparaj came first and won a gold medal in the 2014 Mr. Sri Lanka Contest. Later in 2014, Pushparaj came second and scored a silver medal in the AFBF 48th Asian Championship (IFBB) (100 kg Category). In 2014, he became the first Sri Lankan to take part in the US based competition, Mr & Mrs Atlas and Fitness Expo Contest, and came fourth place.

2016-2018
In 2016 he came first (Gold) in the Open Weightlifting Championship in Oman (Under 100 kg), and then came third (Bronze) at the Wawan Classic Expo International Bodybuilding Championship 2016, held in Kuwait.

In 2017, he came first and won a gold medal in the 51st Asian Bodybuilding and Physiques Sports Festival in South Korea, and was titled Mr Asia. Following his 2017 Win in Thailand, Pushparaj was gifted a house and a sum of Rs. 1 million, by Sajith Premadasa (who was Housing and Construction Minister at the time).

In 2018, he then went on to secure a silver medal at the IFBB Austrian International Bodybuilding Championship, held on 19 May 2018.

Pushparaj emerged as the World Champion at the 10th World Bodybuilding Championship (over 100 kg category) held in Bangkok, Thailand on 16 December 2018, where he was crowned Mr Universe. In March 2019, he was awarded the Popular Sports Personality of the Year as a part of the Newsfirst Platinum Awards.

2020-Present
In May 2020, Pushparaj participated under the Super Heavyweight division at the Arnold Amateur competition and placed 4th overall.

Issues with Local IFBB Elite Pro & SLBF Corruption
Pushparaj faced several issues caused by the local Sri Lankan Bodybuilding Federation (SLBF), they were attempting to prevent Lucion from representing Sri Lanka. This is all due to a conflict with the SLBF over his criticism of the body's support of the IFBB Elite Pro, an unofficial break-away group from the IFBB.

Pushparaj accused the IFBB Elite Pro of being a corrupt body, especially in Sri Lanka. He has had to pay for his own flight tickets, and other associated costs, as the SLBF refuses to sponsor him, despite his victories. Even when he arrived in Sri Lanka after winning the WBPF as overall champion in 2017, he was not welcomed officially by anybody, only his fans came to greet him.

Pushpraj claims that the SLBF attempted to have him banned, by contacting the Global Bodybuilding Organisation, who organised the 2017 Mr Atlas competition in Los Angeles, and thats why his VISA was initially rejected.

SLBF then accused Pushparaj of using banned substances. He denied the allegations, and accused the federation of attempting to tarnish his image and prevent him from taking part in international events representing Sri Lanka. But despite the challenges faced, Pushparaj continues to represent Sri Lanka internationally, by super-ceding the SLBF, because he represents the WBPF, which is globally more recognised.

Contest history 
 2012 - Earned IFBB pro card
 2013 - 1st (Gold) - IFBB Pro Championship in Oman 
 2014 - 1st (Gold) - Mr. Sri Lanka Contest
 2014 - 2nd (Silver) - AFBF 48th Asian Championship (IFBB) (100 KG Category) 
 2014 - 4th Place - Mr & Mrs Atlas and Fitness Expo Contest 
 2014 - 1st (Gold) - Open Weightlifting Championship in Oman (Under 100 kg)
 2016 - 3rd (Bronze) - Wawan Classic Expo International Bodybuilding Championship 2016, held in Kuwait.
 2017 - 1st (Gold) Mr Asia Overall Champion - 51st Asian Bodybuilding and Physiques Sports Festival in South Korea
 2018 - 2nd (Silver) - IFBB Austrian International Bodybuilding Championship
 2018 - 1st (World champion- Mr Universe) -  10th WBPF World Championship (100 kg+ category), in Bangkok, Thailand
 2020 - 4th Place - IFBB Pro Arnold Classic Amateur - Super Heavyweight Division

Awards 
 2019 - Popular Sports Personality of the Year - Newsfirst Platinum Awards
 2020 - 10th WBPF World Championship

See also 
 List of male professional bodybuilders

References

External links
 
 WBPF - Official Website
 ABBF - Official Website

Living people
Sri Lankan Tamil sportspeople
Professional bodybuilders
Sri Lankan bodybuilders
1982 births
Sri Lankan sportspeople
Bodybuilding in Sri Lanka
Sri Lankan male weightlifters